The Trap is a 1946 crime film directed by Howard Bretherton and starring Sidney Toler and Victor Sen Yung. The main premise is that two members of a show troupe are murdered, and detective Charlie Chan is called in to solve the case. The title credit mentions "Charlie Chan" as appearing in the film, as if he were an actor and not a fictional character portrayed by Toler.

This was Toler's 22nd and final appearance as Chan, and his final film of any kind. Suffering from cancer during his last few films, Toler was often so weak that he could hardly walk or say his lines coherently.

Plot
Calamity ensues at the beach villa in Malibu, California, where Cole King's theatre ensemble resides, when one of the showgirls, Adelaide, is challenging Marcia, who is Cole's girl and the star of the show.

Marcia retaliates by threatening to reveal Adelaide's secret marriage to a doctor by the name of George Brandt. She also steals a letter to Adelaide from said Brandt, using one of the other showgirls, Lois, who is hiding the fact that she is under eighteen.

When Marcia vanishes and Lois' dead body is found by one of the other members of the group, San Toy. The cause of death is strangulation, and the technique used is used by the French and the Chinese. Immediately, the French Adelaide and Chinese San Toy are placed under suspicion as possible perpetrators.

Also living under the same roof are the group's press agent Rick Daniels and costume chief Mrs. Thorn. Daniels suggests they make Lois' death look like drowning, but San Toy contacts her friend Jimmy, who is the son of reputed sleuth Charlie Chan, asking for help to solve the murder mystery.
Chan starts his investigation, and soon both his assistant, Birmingham, and San Toy are attacked, but without a mortal ending. Another member of the theatre group, Clementine, discovers Marcia dead and strangled on the beach, with a silk cord still around her neck.

Daniels tries to get rid of Marcia's robe, and is seen by Chan, who concludes it was the belt from the robe that was found around Marcia's neck. Daniels claims he is innocent and that someone put the robe in King's room to frame him for the murder. King starts to believe Daniels is the killer trying to get rid of the evidence.

Chan finds out that doctor Brandt was previously accused of murdering his ex-wife but was cleared from suspicion. However, it destroyed his future career as a physician. He changed his identity, enlisted and went to Europe, where he met Adelaide and they married.

Chan talks to Dr. Brandt, who admits to finding his wife Adelaides' body, but not to killing her. To catch the real killer Chan decides to set a trap. Everything works as planned, and the killer tries to strangle San Toy that night, but Chan's son Jimmy comes to San's rescue and accidentally foils the trap.

Chan, Birmingham and Jimmy then chase the killer, and it turns out it is Mrs. Thorn, who was previously married to King. She left him and wasn't allowed back after that, but had to serve as head of costumes. She killed the women because they were involved with her former husband, out of jealousy and to hurt King. Brandt is cleared of all suspicion, and Chan promises to get his license back by talking to the Board of Medical Examiners.

Cast

Production
The film entered the public domain due to the omission of a valid copyright notice on original prints.

See also
List of films in the public domain in the United States

External links

 
 
 
The Trap jpegs
Charlie Chan Family

References

1946 films
1946 crime films
Charlie Chan films
20th Century Fox films
Articles containing video clips
American crime films
American black-and-white films
1940s American films